Londonderry was a parliamentary constituency in Northern Ireland represented in the House of Commons of the UK Parliament, as well as a constituency in elections to various regional bodies. It was replaced in boundary changes in 1983. Londonderry returned two MPs (1801–1885) and later one (1922–1983).

Boundaries
The constituency consisted, in 1801–1885, of the whole of County Londonderry, except for the parliamentary boroughs of Coleraine and Londonderry City.

The seat was re-created in 1922. As part of the consequences of the devolved Stormont Parliament for Northern Ireland, the number of MPs in the Westminster Parliament was drastically cut. The seat was focused on County Londonderry. It comprised the administrative county of Londonderry and the County Borough of Londonderry.

In 1951, it was one of the last four seats to be uncontested in a United Kingdom general election.

In 1983 the number of seats for Northern Ireland was increased from 12 to 17 and Londonderry was split in two, forming Foyle and East Londonderry.

Members of Parliament

1801–1885

1922–1983

Westminster elections

Elections in the 1830s

Elections in the 1840s

 Caused by Bateson's resignation by accepting the office of Steward of the Chiltern Hundreds

 Caused by Bateson's death

Elections in the 1850s

 Caused by Bateson's appointment as a Lord Commissioner of the Treasury

 Caused by Bateson's resignation.

Elections in the 1860s

Elections in the 1870s

 Caused by Smyth's death.

Elections in the 1880s

 Caused by Law's appointment as Attorney-General for Ireland

 Caused by Law's appointment as Lord Chancellor of Ireland

 Caused by Porter's appointment as Master of the Rolls

Elections in the 1920s

anti-partition

Elections in the 1930s

Elections in the 1940s

Elections in the 1950s

In the 1951 Londonderry by-election and the 1951 United Kingdom general election, William Wellwood was elected unopposed.

Elections in the 1960s

Elections in the 1970s

Politics and history of the constituency
From its inception Londonderry had a unionist majority, though by the 1970s the nationalist vote was approaching 40% in some elections.

In 1974 the Ulster Unionist Party repudiated the Sunningdale Agreement and so did not reselect Robin Chichester-Clark, who had been a Minister in the government of Edward Heath. Instead they ran William Ross, who held the seat until 1983. He was then elected for the new East Londonderry.

For the history of the area post 1983, please see Foyle (UK Parliament constituency) and East Londonderry.

Notes

References 

Westminster constituencies in County Londonderry (historic)
Constituencies of the Parliament of the United Kingdom established in 1801
Constituencies of the Parliament of the United Kingdom disestablished in 1885
Constituencies of the Parliament of the United Kingdom established in 1922
Constituencies of the Parliament of the United Kingdom disestablished in 1983
Politics of Derry (city)